SNAP-1 is a British nanosatellite in low Earth orbit. The satellite was built at the Surrey Space Centre by Surrey Satellite Technology Ltd (SSTL) and members of the University of Surrey. It was launched on 28 June 2000 on board a Kosmos-3M rocket from the Plesetsk Cosmodrome in northern Russia.  It shared the launch with a Russian Nadezhda search and relay spacecraft and the Chinese Tsinghua-1 microsatellite.

Mission
The objectives of the SNAP-1 mission were to:

 Develop and prove a modular commercial off-the-shelf (COTS) based nanosatellite bus.
 Evaluate new manufacturing techniques and technologies.
 Image the Tsinghua-1 microsatellite during its deployment (timed to occur a few seconds after the deployment of SNAP-1).
 Demonstrate the systems required for future nanosatellite constellations.  For example: three-axis attitude control, Global Positioning System (GPS) based orbit determination, and orbital manoeuvres.  
 Depending on propellant availability, rendezvous with Tsinghua-1 and demonstrate formation flying.

During deployment, SNAP-1 successfully imaged the Nadezhda and Tsinghua-1 satellites that accompanied it on the launch.  Once in orbit, SNAP-1 achieved three axis attitude control, then demonstrated its orbital maintenance capability using its butane cold gas propulsion system.

Architecture
The  SNAP-1 satellite contained the following modules:

 Power System
 VHF Receiver
 S-band Transmitter
 Attitude and Orbit Control System (AOCS)
 Cold-Gas Propulsion (CGP) System
 On-Board Computer (OBC)
 VHF spread-spectrum communications payload
 UHF inter-satellite link
 Machine Vision System (MVS)

References

University of Surrey
Satellites orbiting Earth
Satellites of the United Kingdom
Spacecraft launched in 2000